WWXL (1450 AM) is a radio station licensed to Manchester, Kentucky, broadcasting with a full-time signal of 1,000 watts.

The station broadcasts from studios at 103 Third Street in downtown Manchester.

History
Established in 1956, WWXL is Clay County's oldest radio station. The station was originally a daytime-only service assigned to 1580 kHz. It was transferred to 1450 kHz, 24-hour operation and 250 watts in 1958; power increased to the present 1,000 watts in 1959.

History of call letters
The call letters WWXL previously were assigned to an AM station in Peoria, Illinois. It began broadcasting May 24, 1948, on 1590 kHz with 1 KW power (full-time).

References

External links

WXL